This page shows the main events during the 1999 year in the sport of athletics throughout the world.

International Events

 All-Africa Games
 Balkan Games
 Central American and Caribbean Championships
 Pan American Games
 Pan Arab Games
 South American Championships
 World Championships
 World Cross Country Championships
 World Indoor Championships
 World Student Games

World records

Men

Women

Awards

Men

Women

Men's Best Year Performances

400m Hurdles

3,000m Steeplechase

Pole vault

Hammer throw

Decathlon

Women's Best Year Performances

60 metres

100 metres

200 metres

Half marathon

60 metres

100m Hurdles

400m Hurdles

3,000m Steeplechase

High jump

Shot put

Pole vault

Hammer throw

Heptathlon

Marathon

Men's competition

Pan American Games

Best Year Performances

Women's competition

Pan American Games

Best Year Performances

Deaths
January 5 — Jarmila Nygrýnová (45), Czech long jumper (b. 1953)
January 9 — James Peters (80), English long-distance runner (b. 1918)
January 28 — Josef Doležal (78), Czechoslovak race walker (b. 1920)
February 3 — Mikko Hietanen (87),Finnish long-distance runner (b. 1911)
May 17 — João Carlos de Oliveira (44), Brazilian athlete (b. 1954)
May 18 — Betty Robinson (87), American athlete (b. 1911)
June 30 — Bob Backus (72), American hammer thrower (b. 1926)
August 26 — Elena Murgoci (39), Romanian long-distance runner (b. 1960)

References
 ARRS

 
Athletics (track and field) by year